The canton of Sedan-3 is an administrative division of the Ardennes department, northern France. It was created at the French canton reorganisation which came into effect in March 2015. Its seat is in Sedan.

It consists of the following communes:

Balan
Bazeilles
Daigny
Francheval
La Moncelle
Pouru-aux-Bois
Pouru-Saint-Remy
Sedan (partly)

References

Cantons of Ardennes (department)